Abralia astrosticta is a species of enoploteuthid cephalopod present in the waters of Australia, French Polynesia, Japan, New Zealand, the Philippines and Hawaii. They have large ventral photophores. Females carry oocytes 1.0 mm in length in their ovaries.

References

Abralia
Molluscs described in 1909
Taxa named by Samuel Stillman Berry